Mini, born March 12, 1985, is a Japanese model and electro-pop singer who debuted in 2010 on major label Avex. She is produced by Jin, who also produces GReeeeN.

Discography

Albums
 エレクトハーコーバンバンピカソ ("Electro Hardcore Bam Bam Picasso"). (May 9, 2012) Oricon Weekly Albums: No. 257

Singles
 Are U Ready? (March 3, 2010)
 Are U Ready?
 Special memory
 Are U Ready? "Nakata Yasutaka (capsule)" Remix
 Girls Spirit (September 1, 2010)
 Girls Spirit
 Dear Friend
 Baby BaBy
 Candy Girl 2011 (October 19, 2011)
 Candy Girl 2011

Collaborations
 [2010.01.27] Back-On – ONE STEP! / Tomorrow never knows
 ONE STEP! (feat.mini)

References

External links 
 Official Site 
 Official Blog 
 Official Twitter 

1985 births
Living people